Rickmansworth (Church Street) railway station was a London and North Western Railway (LNWR) station in Rickmansworth, Hertfordshire, UK. Opened in 1862, it was the terminus of a  branch line which used to run from Watford. The station closed to passengers in 1952, although the line continued to be used as a goods line until 1967. Church Street station has since been demolished.

Church Street station was the terminus of the Watford and Rickmansworth Railway (W&RR), a business venture of the Whig politician, Robert Grosvenor, 1st Baron Ebury (1801–1893). It opened on 1 October 1862.

However, the GWR withdrew its funding for the scheme and line was never extended. The line failed to operate at a profit, the W&RR ran into financial difficulties, and eventually the operation was taken over by the London and North Western Railway in 1881.

In 1923, under the London, Midland and Scottish Railway (LMS), the Rickmansworth line and the service from Watford Junction to London Euston was converted to fourth-rail electric trains. The station was renamed Rickmansworth (Church Street) on 25 September 1950. It continued to be operated as a branch line from Watford by British Rail until the passenger service was withdrawn on 3 March 1952.
The station and tracks continued to be used for goods services until the line was cut back to one of the intermediate freight sidings.

The track to Watford has since been removed; the trackbed to Watford is now the Ebury Way rail trail. The platforms and station buildings have been demolished; the site is now occupied by social housing. A new hotel now stands between the old station site and the canal.

References

External links
 Subterranea Britannica - Details and pictures of Rickmansworth (Church Street)

Disused railway stations in Three Rivers District
Former London and North Western Railway stations
Railway stations in Great Britain opened in 1862
Railway stations in Great Britain closed in 1952
Rickmansworth
1862 establishments in England